Spencer Lemon Kayden (born May 27, 1968) is an American actress, comedian and writer. Kayden played Little Sally in the Broadway musical Urinetown and was a cast member on sketch comedy series MADtv. She also voiced Mrs. Pepper on Blue's Clues, taking over the role from Penelope Jewkes after the first season.

Biography
Spencer Kayden was born the only girl out of four siblings to a father who worked as a pop-up book publisher and a mother who worked as a psychotherapist. Kayden grew up in Orange County, California, and went on to study drama at Northwestern University in Evanston, Illinois. She joined the Chicago cast of Too Much Light Makes the Baby Go Blind  and moved to New York in 1993 to start the New York run of the show.

Kayden received critical acclaim and notice for her performance in the musical Urinetown, where she played Little Sally, the pig-tailed girl who helps explain the plot. She played in the 1999 New York International Fringe Festival production, and then was in the original Off-Broadway and Broadway casts in 2001 and returned in 2003. The CurtainUp reviewer noted in reviewing the Off-Broadway production: "But while Spencer Kayden does everything right in her portrayal of the droll little girl who alternates begging for 'penny for a pee' with Shirley Temple/Charlie McCarthy exchanges with the deceptively kindly neighborhood cop, her Sally is wrong. This 'bad' idea is outrageously good for lots of laughs. The central joke works."

It is from her theater performances that she was discovered by Fox executives and cast as a featured performer on MADtv.

Kayden also played the role of Mrs. Pepper in the popular Nickelodeon kids series Blue's Clues since 1996.

Kayden starred in the farce Don't Dress for Dinner at the Royal George Theatre, Chicago, Illinois, from November 2008 to January 2009. She reprised her role as the cook in the Broadway production, which opened in March 2012 at the American Airlines Theatre.

Personal life
Kayden is the sister of film director Michael Almereyda. She has been married to actor Mark Harelik since 2004, and they have one child together. She has listed Irene Dunne, Peter Sellers and Frances McDormand as some her acting idols.

Awards and nominations

MADtv

References

External links

Internet Off-Broadway Database
 

1968 births
Living people
American television actresses
American voice actresses
American stage actresses
American musical theatre actresses
Clarence Derwent Award winners
Northwestern University School of Communication alumni
American sketch comedians
21st-century American comedians
Theatre World Award winners
21st-century American actresses